A multimodal logic is a modal logic that has more than one primitive modal operator. They find substantial applications in theoretical computer science.

Overview
A modal logic with n primitive unary modal operators  is called an n-modal logic. Given these operators and negation, one can always add  modal operators defined as  if and only if .

Perhaps the first substantive example of a two-modal logic is Arthur Prior's tense logic, with two modalities, F and P, corresponding to "sometime in the future" and "sometime in the past". A logic with infinitely many modalities is dynamic logic, introduced by Vaughan Pratt in 1976 and having a separate modal operator for every regular expression. A version of temporal logic introduced in 1977 and intended for program verification has two modalities, corresponding to dynamic logic's [A] and [A*] modalities for a single program A, understood as the whole universe taking one step forwards in time. The term multimodal logic itself was not introduced until 1980. Another example of a multimodal logic is the Hennessy–Milner logic, itself a fragment of the more expressive modal μ-calculus, which is also a fixed-point logic.

Multimodal logic can be used also to formalize a kind of knowledge representation: the motivation of epistemic logic is allowing several agents (they are regarded as subjects capable of forming beliefs, knowledge); and managing  the belief or knowledge of each agent, so that epistemic assertions can be formed about them. The modal operator  must be capable of bookkeeping the cognition of each agent,  thus  must be indexed on the set of the agents. The motivation is that  should assert "The subject i has knowledge about  being true". But it can be used also for formalizing "the subject i believes ". For formalization of meaning based on the possible world semantics approach, a multimodal generalization of Kripke semantics can be used: instead of a single "common" accessibility relation, there is a series of them indexed on the set of agents.

Notes

References

External links 
Stanford Encyclopedia of Philosophy: "Modal logic" – by James Garson.

Modal logic